Sokołów may refer to the following places in Poland:

Sokołów, district of the city of Łódź
Sokołów Podlaski, seat of Sokołów County in Masovian Voivodeship (east-central Poland)
Sokołów County, in Masovian Voivodeship (east-central Poland)
Sokołów Małopolski, town in Subcarpathian Voivodeship (south-east Poland)
Sokołów, Skierniewice County in Łódź Voivodeship (central Poland)
Sokołów, Gmina Goszczanów in Łódź Voivodeship (central Poland)
Sokołów, Gmina Sieradz in Łódź Voivodeship (central Poland)
Sokołów, Gostynin County in Masovian Voivodeship (east-central Poland)
Sokołów, Pruszków County in Masovian Voivodeship (east-central Poland)
Sokołów, Lubusz Voivodeship (west Poland)
Sokołów, West Pomeranian Voivodeship (north-west Poland)

See also
 Sokołów Dolny
 Sokołów Górny
 Nowy Sokołów
 Stary Sokołów
 Sokołów-Towarzystwo
 Sokolov (surname)
 Sokoloff, surname